Ivești is a commune in Galați County, Western Moldavia, Romania. It is composed of two villages, Bucești and Ivești.

Natives
Hortensia Papadat-Bengescu
Ștefan Petică
I. Valerian

References

Communes in Galați County
Localities in Western Moldavia